The Russian Third League 1997 was the 4th and, so far, final time competition on the fourth level of Russian football was professional. In 1998 Russian Third League was disbanded and the Amateur Football League moved back to fourth level of the Russian football pyramid. All the 1997 Russian Third League teams that were not promoted to the Second Division moved to the Amateur Football League (unless otherwise noted below). There were 5 zones with 88 teams starting the competition (6 were excluded before the end of the season).

Zone 1

Overview

Standings

Notes.

 FC Alania-d Vladikavkaz were excluded from the league after playing 35 games and gaining 43 points. Opponents were awarded a 3-0 win in the remaining games.
 FC Iriston Vladikavkaz and FC Dynamo-Imamat Makhachkala were awarded 1 home win each.
 FC Torpedo Georgiyevsk played their first professional season.
 FC Anzhi-2 Kaspiysk renamed to FC Anzhi-d and moved to Makhachkala. They did not participate in national-level competitions in 1998.
 FC Dynamo-d Stavropol, PFC Spartak-d Nalchik and FC Olimp Kislovodsk did not participate in national-level competitions in 1998.
 FC Alania-d Vladikavkaz last played professionally in 1995 as FC Spartak-Alania-d Vladikavkaz.

Top goalscorers 

35 goals

 Budun Budunov (FC Anzhi-d Makhachkala)

30 goals

 Kyamran Nurakhmedov (FC Dynamo-Imamat Makhachkala)

28 goals

 Alisher Gippot (FC Torpedo Georgiyevsk)

26 goals

 Aslan Maremukov (FC Nart Nartkala)

25 goals

 Nikolai Tkachenko (FC Lokomotiv Mineralnye Vody)

24 goals

 Eduard Khachaturyan (FC Mozdok)

22 goals

 Mikhail Pavlov (FC Lokomotiv Mineralnye Vody)
  Aleksandr Zaalishvili (FC Nart Nartkala)

21 goals

 Gadzhi Bamatov (FC Anzhi-d Makhachkala)
 Iosif Khuazhev (FC Mozdok)

Zone 2

Overview

Standings

Notes.

 FC Lokomotiv Yelets were excluded from the league after playing 15 games and gaining 34 points. Opponents were awarded a 3-0 win in the remaining games.
 FC Energiya-d Kamyshin were excluded from the league after playing 15 games and gaining 9 points. Opponents were awarded a 3-0 win in the remaining games.
 FC Fakel-d Voronezh was excluded from the league after playing 17 games and gaining 7 points. Opponents were awarded a 3-0 win in the remaining games.
 FC Rassvet Troitskoye promoted from the Amateur Football League. They did not participate in the national-level competitions in 1998.
 FC Spartak-Bratskiy Yuzhny, FC Niva Slavyansk-na-Kubani, FC Volgodonsk and FC Kuban-d Krasnodar did not participate in the national-level competitions in 1998.
 FC Dynamo Mikhailovka renamed to FC Rotor-2.
 FC Energiya-d Kamyshin last played professionally in 1992 as FC Tekstilshchik-d Kamyshin. They did not participate in the national-level competitions in 1998.
 FC Fakel-d Voronezh played their first professional season. They did not participate in the national-level competitions in 1998.

Top goalscorers 

16 goals

 Murat Gomleshko (FC Niva Slavyansk-na-Kubani)
 Viktor Ledovskikh (FC Spartak-Bratskiy Yuzhny)
 Denis Popov (FC Kuban Slavyansk-na-Kubani)

15 goals

 Gennadi Remezov (FC Rassvet Troitskoye)

11 goals

 Aleksandr Bocharnikov (FC Kuban Slavyansk-na-Kubani)
 Sergei Glazunov (FC Salyut Saratov)
 Valeri Prokulatov (FC Volgodonsk)

10 goals

 Sergei Afanasyev (FC Metallurg Krasny Sulin)
 Roman Oreshchuk (FC Rostselmash-d Rostov-on-Don)
 Sergei Pogarchenko (FC Shakhtyor Shakhty)

Zone 3

Overview

Standings

Notes.

 FC Roda Moscow deducted 6 points.
 FC Khimki and FC Spartak Lukhovitsy promoted from the Amateur Football League. 
 FC Torpedo-ZIL Moscow played their first professional season.
 FC Roda Moscow and FC Chertanovo Moscow did not participate in the national-level competitions in 1998.
 FC Mashinostroitel Sergiyev Posad moved to Moscow and renamed to FC Sportakademklub.
 FC Avangard-Kortek Kolomna renamed to FC Kolomna.
 FC MEPhI Moscow promoted from the Amateur Football League, where it played in 1996 as FSh MEPhI. They did not participate in the national-level competitions in 1998.
 FC Dynamo-2 Moscow did not participate in the national-level competitions in 1998 (FC Dynamo-d Moscow was renamed to FC Dynamo-2 in 1998).

Top goalscorers 

21 goals

 Sergei Kulichenko (PFC CSKA-d Moscow)

20 goals

 Viktor Voronkov (FC Roda Moscow)

19 goals

 Sergei Lutovinov (FC Spartak-d Moscow)

17 goals

 Sabir Khamzin (FC Sportakademklub Moscow)
 Sergei Kravchuk (FC Khimki)
 Sergei Lavrentyev (FC Torpedo-ZIL Moscow)

16 goals

 Sergei Artyomov (FC Dynamo-d Moscow)
 Gleb Panfyorov (FC Torpedo-ZIL Moscow)
 Aleksei Snigiryov (FC Lokomotiv-d Moscow/FC Torpedo-ZIL Moscow)

15 goals

  Guy-Martin Ngaha Tchamoah (FC Roda Moscow)
 Aleksandr Rogachyov (FC Kolomna)
 Vadim Shatalin (FC Khimki)

Zone 4

Overview

Standings

Notes.

 FC Spartak Rybnoye were excluded from the league after playing 18 games and gaining 14 points. All their results were discarded. That was their first professional season. They did not participate in the national-level competitions in 1998.
 FC Industriya Borovsk were excluded from the league after playing 19 games and gaining 20 points. Opponents were awarded 3-0 wins in the remaining games. They did not participate in the national-level competitions in 1998.
 FC Khimik Dzerzhinsk awarded one home loss.
 FC Torpedo-Viktoriya Nizhny Novgorod played their first professional season.
 FC Lokomotiv Kaluga promoted from the Amateur Football League, where they played in 1996 as FC Smena-PRMZ Kaluga.
 FC Energiya Velikiye Luki promoted from the Amateur Football League.
 FC Lokomotiv-d Saint Petersburg and FC Lokomotiv-d Nizhny Novgorod did not participate in the national-level competitions in 1998.

Top goalscorers 

18 goals

 Nikolai Sidorov (FC Lokomotiv Kaluga)

17 goals

 Valeri Korneyev (FC Spartak Bryansk)

14 goals

 Andrei Alenichev (FC Energiya Velikiye Luki)
 Dmitri Golubev (FC Metallurg Vyksa)

13 goals

 Yevgeni Losev (FC Lokomotiv Kaluga)
 Dmitri Pozhidayev (FC Energetik Uren)

12 goals

 Anatoli Lychagov (FC Energetik Uren)
 Nail Safayev (FC Torpedo Vladimir)
 Valeri Vasilyev (FC Stroitel Morshansk)

11 goals

 Aleksandr Gultyayev (FC Mashinostroitel Pskov)
 Vladislav Khakhalev (FC Torpedo Vladimir)

Zone 5

Overview

Standings

Notes.

 FC Zenit Chelyabinsk and FC Energiya Ulyanovsk promoted from the Amateur Football League.
 FC Metiznik Magnitogorsk, FC Elektron Vyatskiye Polyany, and FC KAMAZ-Chally-d Naberezhnye Chelny did not participate in the national-level competitions in 1998.

Top goalscorers 

23 goals

 Vyacheslav Ulitin (FC Zenit Penza)

21 goals

 Vyacheslav Khovanskiy (FC Trubnik Kamensk-Uralsky)

19 goals

 Andrei Eskov (FC Iskra Engels)

17 goals

 Pavel Yumatov (FC Neftyanik Pokhvistnevo)

16 goals

 Aleksandr Fedoseyev (FC Zenit Penza)

15 goals

 Sergei Sviridkin (FC Gazovik Orenburg)

14 goals

 Aleksandr Fyodorov (FC Progress Zelenodolsk)
 Aleksandr Nikulin (FC Neftyanik Pokhvistnevo)
 Yuri Petrov (FC Dynamo Perm)

13 goals

 Igor Shiropatin (FC Uralets Nizhny Tagil)

See also
1997 Russian Top League
1997 Russian First League
1997 Russian Second League

4
1997
Russia
Russia